Raijua is an island in the Lesser Sunda Islands in Indonesia.  Its total land area is 13.9 square miles (36 square km). Raijua is sometimes called The Wedge by surfers because it includes an exposed reef break, making it an ideal surfing location during Indonesia's dry season (May through October).

References

Solor Archipelago